Joel Thomas Zimmerman (born January 5, 1981), known professionally as Deadmau5 (stylized as deadmau5; pronounced "dead-mouse"), is a Canadian electronic music producer and DJ. He mainly produces progressive house music, though he also produces and DJs other genres of electronic music, including techno under the alias Testpilot. Zimmerman has received six Grammy Award nominations for his work.

He has worked with other DJs and producers, such as Kaskade, Wolfgang Gartner, Rob Swire, and Chris Lake. He has also collaborated with Steve Duda under the group name BSOD (Better Sounding On Drugs), and was part of the group named WTF? with Duda, Tommy Lee and DJ Aero. In 2007, he founded his own record label, Mau5trap. Deadmau5 is currently one of the highest paid electronic music producers in the world, and is a masked music artist similar to Marshmello and Daft Punk. His works have been included in compilation albums such as Tiësto's In Search of Sunrise 6: Ibiza and presented on Armin van Buuren's A State of Trance radio show.

In 2000, an early 12" single produced on vinyl titled "I Don't Want No Other" was released by Zimmerman and Derek Caesar, under the group name Dred and Karma. A 2006 compilation album titled Deadmau5 Circa 1998–2002 was self-released under the alias Halcyon441. His debut studio album, Get Scraped was released in 2005, with follow-up Vexillology in 2006. His breakthrough, Random Album Title, was released in 2008 and was certified gold in Canada, and silver in the United Kingdom. The album includes seminal release "Faxing Berlin", "Not Exactly", and moderate chart hit "I Remember" (with Kaskade). In 2009, his fourth studio album For Lack of a Better Name was released to critical acclaim, featuring Rob Swire collaboration "Ghosts 'n' Stuff", "Hi Friend", and the critically acclaimed "Strobe". His fifth studio album, 4×4=12, released in late 2010, supported by singles "Some Chords", "Animal Rights", "Sofi Needs a Ladder", and "Raise Your Weapon".

In 2012, Zimmerman released singles "The Veldt" and "Professional Griefers" (featuring Gerard Way) to commercial success. These singles were featured on his sixth studio album, Album Title Goes Here. Following his departure from long-time label Ultra Records, Zimmerman released his seventh studio album, While(1<2), through Astralwerks and Virgin EMI in 2014. The album's release was supported by its four singles; "Avaritia", "Seeya", "Infra Turbo Pigcart Racer", and "Phantoms Can't Hang". After a brief hiatus, Zimmerman's eighth studio album, W:/2016Album/, was released in late 2016, with singles "Snowcone" and "Let Go". He subsequently composed the score for the 2019 action film Polar, and released the singles "Satrn", "Coasted", "Fall" the same year. In 2020, "Pomegranate" and "Bridged by a Lightwave" were released ahead of his ninth album.

Early life
Zimmerman was born in Niagara Falls, Ontario, Canada. His mother, Nancy (née Johnson), is a visual artist, and his father, Rodney Thomas "Rod" Zimmerman, is a General Motors plant worker. He has two siblings, Jennifer (older) and Chris (younger). His ancestry includes German, Swiss, and English heritage. He received his first keyboard for Christmas when he was a teenager. His music career began in the late 1990s, with a chiptune and demoscene movements-influenced sound with the Impulse Tracker. 
Zimmerman graduated from Westlane Secondary School in Niagara Falls. He then worked with an online music licensing company and as a programmer. He adopted the name Deadmau5, which referred to a dead mouse he found in his computer; the unique spelling was a result of a maximum character limitation.

Career

1998–2006: Get Scraped and self-released compilations
Zimmerman released his debut studio album, titled Get Scraped on July 26, 2005. The tracks "Just Before 8bit", "Nice Try, Kiddo" and "Uploading and Downloading" from Project 56 were edited and expanded upon in Get Scraped under the names "8bit", "Try Again", and "Unspecial Effects", respectively. Tracks "Bored of Canada", "Intelstat" and "I Forget" reappear on this album as is, as well as "The Oshawa Connection" from Deadmau5 Circa 1998–2002.

Three self-released compilations, Project 56, Deadmau5 Circa 1998–2002, and A Little Oblique, were finished in 2006, with Project 56 seeing an official release two years later.

2006–2008: Vexillology, Mau5trap, and Random Album Title

In 2006, Zimmerman released his second studio album, Vexillology, on November 6, 2006, through Play Records.

In 2007, Zimmerman founded his own record label, Mau5trap, which, along with Ultra Records and Ministry of Sound, released the 2008 album Random Album Title, which saw the collaboration of Zimmerman and Chicago producer Kaskade with "I Remember". Random Album Title, saw a digital release on September 2, 2008, via Ultra Records in the United States and Ministry of Sound in the United Kingdom and Europe. Physical copies of the album were released in November 2008. Singles "Faxing Berlin" on October 25, 2006, and "Not Exactly" on August 27, 2007, were released prior to the album's release. Single "I Remember" (with Kaskade) was later released on September 15, 2008, before the album's release.

In the United States, Zimmerman's collaboration with Kaskade, "Move for Me", reached number one on Billboard magazine's Dance/Mix Show Airplay chart in its September 6, 2008, issue. Since then, Zimmerman has seen two more tracks, also collaborations ("I Remember" with Kaskade and "Ghosts 'n' Stuff" with Rob Swire), reach number one on Billboards Dance/Mix Show Airplay chart, making him the only Canadian to have three number-one tracks on that chart. He is also the sixth Canadian to top that chart, following Deborah Cox, Nelly Furtado, Dragonette, Justin Bieber, and The Weeknd, each with one apiece.

2009–2011: For Lack of a Better Name and 4×4=12

On September 22, 2009, Ultra Records released his album For Lack of a Better Name in the United States, and October 5 internationally. On a subsequent tour in the fall of 2009, Zimmerman's performances were recorded and made available for sale immediately following the concerts on USB wristband flash drives. For Lack of a Better Name includes two of Zimmerman's most popular songs, "Ghosts 'n' Stuff" (featuring Rob Swire) and "Strobe". "Ghosts 'n' Stuff" was released on November 25, 2008, before the album, while "Strobe" was released on February 23, 2010, after the album's release.

MTV named Zimmerman as the house DJ for the 2010 MTV Video Music Awards and MTV PUSH artist of the week on August 16, 2010. He expressed gratitude towards Lady Gaga and David Guetta for bringing dance into the pop music scene and paving the way for him to the mainstream. At the awards, Zimmerman performed with Jason Derulo and Travie McCoy. His song "Ghosts 'n' Stuff" had been featured on the soundtrack for the MTV reality series Jersey Shore earlier.

His fifth studio album, 4×4=12, was released on December 6, 2010, in the United Kingdom and December 7, 2010, in the United States. Singles "Some Chords" on May 3, 2010, "Animal Rights" (with Wolfgang Gartner) on September 6, and "Sofi Needs a Ladder" (featuring SOFI) on November 1 were released and were featured on the album. "Raise Your Weapon" (featuring Greta Svabo Bech) was released later on May 23, 2011. "Some Chords" was featured on an episode of CSI: Crime Scene Investigation where Zimmerman made a cameo appearance, and an instrumental version of "Sofi Needs a Ladder" was featured in the film The Hangover Part II. That year, he also released two non-album singles "Aural Psynapse" and "HR 8938 Cephei".

2012–2014: Album Title Goes Here and While(1<2)

On August 9, 2012, Zimmerman announced his sixth studio album, Album Title Goes Here, which was released on September 24 of that year. Singles from this album include "Maths" on February 17, 2012, "The Veldt" (featuring Chris James) on May 8, and "Professional Griefers" (featuring Gerard Way) on August 14. Singles "Channel 42" (with Wolfgang Gartner) on February 12, 2013, and "Telemiscommunications" (with Imogen Heap) on March 12 were released in 2013, after the album was released. His collaboration with Gerard Way on "Professional Griefers" was announced on Facebook prior to release. In December 2012, FUSE TV named "Professional Griefers" one of the top 40 songs of 2012.

In November 2013, Zimmerman deleted three years worth of music from his SoundCloud account, replacing them with an EP of seven melancholy piano sonatas, simply called 7, named after the Latin translations for the seven deadly sins: "Acedia", "Avaritia", "Gula", "Invidia", "Ira", "Luxuria", and "Superbia". The same month, Zimmerman left longtime label Ultra Records and signed with record label Astralwerks, a famed NYC-based imprint that houses artists such as Swedish House Mafia, David Guetta, and The Chemical Brothers. Speaking on the partnership, Zimmerman admitted, "I found a place that knows what to do with my music."

On January 7, 2014, Zimmerman announced via his Twitter account that his much-anticipated new album was complete. "In other news... I finished my album today," the tweet read. "2 discs. 2 continuous mixes. 25 tracks. and something I'm proud of." On May 10, 2014, Deadmau5 announced through his subscription service that his upcoming album would be titled While(1<2) and would be released on June 17, 2014. The album was preceded by the release of four singles: "Avaritia", "Seeya" (featuring Colleen D'Agostino), "Infra Turbo Pigcart Racer" and "Phantoms Can't Hang". Starting on the week of May 20, 2014, each single was released weekly for a total of four weeks leading up to the release of the album.

2015–2016: Absence, return, and W:/2016Album/

On January 13, 2015, it was announced that Deadmau5 would be a headlining act for the Bonnaroo Music and Arts Festival, in Manchester, Tennessee, which was held on June 11–15, 2015. On February 2, 2015, it was announced he would appear at Reading and Leeds Festivals. On July 23, 2015, Valve announced that Deadmau5 was creating a series of sound clips to be featured in their video game Dota 2. The music pack was released alongside the announcement. On August 8, 2015, Deadmau5 performed live at KeyArena in Seattle at the conclusion of the Dota 2 competition The International 5 (TI5). On October 7, 2015, Deadmau5 officially announced that he was leaving his then label Astralwerks and going entirely independent with his own label Mau5trap.

On December 17, 2015, it appeared that Zimmerman was either taking a leave of absence or ending his career altogether after deleting both his Twitter and his Facebook accounts. His Instagram account, however, had not been deleted. On December 21, 2015, Zimmerman reopened his Twitter account and posted an apology to his Tumblr account explaining his disappearance from social media, saying that he was suffering from depression and would be returning to producing music after the new year.

On May 27, 2016, "Snowcone", the first single from Zimmerman in nearly two years, was released as a digital download. This track was later revealed to be the first single from his next album. On November 4, 2016, Zimmerman announced his next studio album, W:/2016Album/, which was released on December 2, 2016, digitally, with vinyl and CD releases on February 17, and March 17, 2017, respectively.

2017–present: Stuff I Used to Do, Where's the Drop?, Polar soundtrack, Mau5ville, and upcoming ninth studio album  
On January 7, 2017, Zimmerman announced a compilation of his earlier work ranging from the years of 1998 to 2007 on Twitter, titled Stuff I Used to Do. Zimmerman also stated that the compilation would release in February of that year. On February 24, 2017, Zimmerman released a limited version of Stuff I Used to Do on WeTransfer. The edition, available until March 3, featured three tracks less than the full album. The album includes tracks from Get Scraped and early compilations, in addition to an alternative mix of "Creep" from While(1<2). The album was officially released on Mau5trap a week later, on March 3, 2017.

On March 25, 2017, Zimmerman began a concert tour with his new "Cube 2.1" stage set entitled Lots of Shows in a Row to promote the release of W:/2016Album/. Zimmerman toured around North America for two months, before touring the rest of the world from June 3, 2017, and Canada from October 6, 2017, with the tour concluding on October 31, 2017. On August 25, 2017, Zimmerman released a stand-alone single entitled "Legendary", featuring guest vocals from rapper Shotty Horroh. A music video for the song was released on Mau5trap's YouTube channel on September 11, 2017. In September 2017, Zimmerman confirmed his next studio album is "on the way".

In March 2018, Zimmerman announced a compilation album comprising orchestral performances of previously released music, titled Where's the Drop?. On March 30, 2018, the album was initially released exclusively on the music streaming service Tidal for a period of three months. On June 29, 2018, the album was officially released on other digital download and streaming services, as well as vinyl. On July 3, 2018, Zimmerman announced an EP and compilation album titled Mau5ville: Level 1, featuring "Monophobia", a collaboration with Rob Swire, as well as tracks from Getter and GTA. It was released on July 13, 2018, through Mau5trap. On September 18, 2018, Zimmerman announced that he was in the process of producing his first ever original film score for the Netflix film Polar directed by Jonas Åkerlund. In October 2018, the track listing of a follow-up EP, Mau5ville: Level 2, was leaked, showing featured collaborations with Lights and Mr. Bill, with no release date confirmed at the time. The EP was released officially on November 16, 2018, through Mau5trap.

On January 25, 2019, Polar premiered on Netflix, with Zimmerman releasing the soundtrack album, Polar (Music from the Netflix Film), through Mau5trap. On February 1, 2019, the third installment in the Mau5ville series, Mau5ville: Level 3 was released through Mau5trap. The compilation EP featured collaborations with Shotty Horroh, Scene of Action as well as tracks from No Mana and C.O.Z. In November 2019, Zimmerman released three new singles, entitled "Satrn", "Coasted" and "Fall", released on the 16th, 22nd and 29th, respectively.

On May 20, 2020, Zimmerman released the single "Pomegranate", featuring The Neptunes. Later in November that year, he worked with Kiesza on the track "Bridged by a Lightwave". Both singles are expected to appear on Zimmerman's next album.

On March 29, 2021, Zimmerman released the single "Nextra" on his new "Hau5trap" label. In 2021, Rezz and Deadmau5 collaborated to release a single named "Hypnocurrency" on Mau5trap.
He also released a new single with singer Lights titled "When the Summer Dies" on July 16.

Kx5
In 2022, Zimmerman and Kaskade announced a collaboration project named Kx5, marking the fourth time the producers have worked together. The first single from the project, "Escape", was released on March 11. In December, the duo headlined a performance in Los Angeles at the L.A. Memorial Coliseum. The concert broke records with a crowd of 50,000 and netted $3.7 million dollars. In January 2023, it was announced that the duo's first album, eponymously titled Kx5, would have a release date of March 17, 2023.

Video game appearances
Zimmerman is a playable avatar in DJ Hero 2, a video game released in October 2010. The game featured several tracks by the artist, including a mix of "Ghosts 'n' Stuff" with Lady Gaga's "Just Dance". He is also featured as a secret unlockable character in the 2014 video game Goat Simulator as "deadgoa7". His music has been included in other video game titles, including a custom soundtrack for Dota 2.

In the mobile app Family Guy: The Quest for Stuff by TinyCo, Deadmau5 was available for purchase as a playable character during the "PeterPalooza".
Virtual versions of his helmet are also an available accessory as a topper and antenna in Rocket League.

In the 2020 video game Fuser, "Ghosts 'n' Stuff" is featured as a mixable song.

Personal life

On July 30, 2010, at the 9:30 Club in Washington, D.C., Zimmerman collapsed on stage, suffering from exhaustion and vomiting. This resulted in the cancellation of the rest of the show, as well as nine shows following the event.

In September 2012, Zimmerman began dating American tattoo artist and TV personality Kat Von D. After breaking up in November 2012, they rekindled their relationship shortly afterwards. On December 15, 2012, Zimmerman proposed to Von D via Twitter, and they announced that they would marry in August 2013 with an aquatic-themed wedding. They both have several matching tattoos, including the numbers "289m3d22h" on both of their arms, a sentimental reference to the day when they met, as well as two black stars underneath their eyes. Zimmerman moved to Los Angeles to live with Von D. In June 2013, Von D announced that they had ended their engagement.

In 2014, Zimmerman purchased a $5 million home in the Campbellville area of Milton, Ontario.

On August 12, 2017, Zimmerman married his fiancée Kelly Fedoni. On June 7, 2021, Zimmerman announced via Instagram that he and Fedoni 
had separated and would divorce, but stated that their relationship had ended amicably.

Etymology
Zimmerman's father claims that when his son was in his early teens, he was chatting with a friend on his computer, which then abruptly shut off. According to Zimmerman's father, he said that it had a smell of burnt wire and had a strange odor. Zimmerman started to dismantle his computer and happened to find a dead mouse. Zimmerman then became known as the "dead mouse guy" among friends. He tried to change his name to "Deadmouse" in an online chat room, but it was too long, so he shortened it to "Deadmau5". "Maus" is the German word for "mouse" and is pronounced the same as in English; the ending character 5 instead of an 's' is a form of leet.

Zimmerman created the original logo—called "mau5head"—while learning how to use 3D modelling software. The logo appears in many different colors and designs, and has been shown on the cover art of most of Zimmerman's albums. He was given the idea to wear a helmet based on the logo by one of his friends, Jay Gordon of the industrial metal band Orgy. In an interview with CBC Television, Zimmerman said that he wants his logo to be an "icon". Fans often attend Deadmau5 concerts sporting their own copy or alteration of the mau5head.

He created his website and began uploading songs to SectionZ and producing under the alias "Deadmau5" in 2002.

Controversies

DirtyCircuit
In 2008, an artist called DirtyCircuit claimed to have been threatened with legal action after using a sample called "LP_Faxing Berlin C_128bpm" that came bundled with FL Studio, and to which Zimmerman claimed copyright. The sample was a direct clip of a full bar of the song. Zimmerman provided a "Demo Track" which came bundled with FL Studio, along with several loop samples. The case caused slight discomfort among the users of FL Studio, and some have pointed out potential inconsistencies in the EULA of the software. Subsequent versions, after FL Studio 8, no longer contained those loop samples.

Disney trademark dispute 

In a 2012 interview with Rolling Stone, Zimmerman acknowledged possible similarities between his Mau5head logo and that of Mickey Mouse, joking that "someone at the Disney patent office fell asleep on that one."

In March 2014, it was reported that The Walt Disney Company had filed a request with the United States Patent and Trademark Office to investigate Zimmerman's application to register the Mau5head emblem as a trademark, noting its resemblance to the figure of Mickey Mouse. Disney officially filed its opposition in September 2014, arguing that the mark is likely to cause confusion because it is "nearly identical in appearance, connotation, and overall commercial impression" to Disney's trademarked iconography of Mickey Mouse. In response to the opposition, Zimmerman spoke out against Disney on Twitter, arguing that the company thinks of people as being "stupid" because "[they] might confuse an established electronic musician/performer with a cartoon mouse." Zimmerman also believed that he had been targeted by Disney due to their attempts to "cash in" on the EDM market, specifically alluding to Dconstructed—a recently released compilation album containing remixes of music from Disney properties by major electronic musicians such as Armin van Buuren, Avicii and Kaskade.

On September 4, 2014, Zimmerman revealed on Twitter that Disney had used "Ghosts 'n' Stuff" in a Mickey Mouse "re-micks" video on their website and YouTube channel without his or his labels' permission, and posted pictures showing a takedown notice that had been sent to Disney by his lawyers. The letter also contained a trademark infringement accusation, arguing that the use of Deadmau5's name in material regarding the video falsely implied his endorsement of it. Disney argued that it had properly licensed the song and that there was "no merit to his statement."

In an October 2014 USPTO filing, Zimmerman argued that Disney has attempted to co-exist with him in goodwill. Zimmerman presented evidence that Disney had been in contact with him regarding potential collaborative projects, including an offer to participate in a "re-imagining" of Fantasia as a live concert tour for the film's 75th anniversary.

In June 2015, Zimmerman's attorney stated that he and Disney had "amicably resolved their dispute."

Meowingtons trademark dispute 
In 2015, Zimmerman attempted to register a trademark for the name of his pet cat, Professor Meowingtons, whom he adopted in 2010 and has incorporated into some of his own merchandising. However, the registration was rejected due to a pre-existing Meowingtons trademark held by an online retailer of the same name established in 2014, which sells cat-themed accessories and clothing. After discovering the trademark, Zimmerman petitioned against it, citing his pre-existing uses.

In March 2017, Zimmerman was sued by Emma Bassiri (the owner of the website) for trademark infringement and unfair competition; the suit argued that claims by Zimmerman that she had named the site specifically after the cat was false. Zimmerman himself told The Hollywood Reporter that "from the very beginning I was working to find a way to resolve this situation amicably", but that he had been forced to "litigate this woman out of existence". On May 15, 2017, Deadmau5 filed a countersuit against Bassiri with the intention of seeking forfeiture of Bassiri's website and domain name.

In March 2018, World Intellectual Property Review reported that Zimmerman and Bassiri had resolved their dispute.

Offensive slurs
In October 2018, Zimmerman posted comments on Twitter during an argument including the statements "I'll bet you suck a guy off for 40 grand, zero fucking questions asked" and "women don't posses penises". These comments were construed by readers as being homophobic and transphobic. Zimmerman apologized for his comments, saying that he "wasn't trying to make blatant transphobic statements", and had "just got into a heated arguement  with some dude online", noting that his comments had been taken "somewhere unintended".

A few days later, during a gaming stream, he referred to a track by fellow electronic artist Slushii as "AIDS fucking music" and calling it "autistic shit". Slushii – who is on the autism spectrum – responded to these comments on Twitter, calling them "really disappointing". Zimmerman later apologized for these comments, citing mental health issues that required "professional help", and stating that he would take time "off the radar" to "work on [himself]".

In February 2019, whilst playing PlayerUnknown's Battlegrounds on a livestream on Twitch, Zimmerman called another player a "fucking cock-sucking stream sniper fag." Twitch suspended Zimmerman from their platform for hate speech, after which he posted: "I know who I am, and I don't have to fucking sit here and cry and defend my fucking self with the obligatory 'I'm not that person, I am sorry' reflex," vowing to never work with the company again. Zimmerman later apologized for his remarks in a Reddit post, and was subsequently reinstated.

Discography

 Get Scraped (2005)
 Vexillology (2006)
 Random Album Title (2008)
 For Lack of a Better Name (2009)
 4×4=12 (2010)
 Album Title Goes Here (2012)
 While(1<2) (2014)
 W:/2016Album/ (2016)

Awards and nominations

See also 

List of ambient music artists

References

External links

 
 Artist Site at Ultra Records 

 
1981 births
Ableton Live users
Canadian DJs
Canadian electronic musicians
Canadian house musicians
Canadian people of Swiss descent
Canadian people of German descent
Canadian people of English descent
Canadian people of Swiss-German descent
Electro house musicians
Electronic dance music DJs
Juno Award for Dance Recording of the Year winners
Living people
Masked musicians
Mau5trap artists
Musicians from the Regional Municipality of Niagara
People from Niagara Falls, Ontario
Progressive house musicians
Remixers
Tracker musicians
Ultra Records artists
Virgin Records artists
20th-century Canadian male musicians
21st-century Canadian male musicians